"Faded Love" is a Western swing song written by Bob Wills, his father John Wills, and his brother, Billy Jack Wills. The tune is considered to be an exemplar of the Western swing fiddle component of American fiddle. 

The melody came from an 1856 ballad, "Darling Nelly Gray", which John Wills knew as a fiddle tune. "Faded Love" is a sentimental song about lost love. The name comes from the refrain that follows each verse: "I remember our faded love".

The song was a major hit for Bob Wills and the Texas Playboys (MGM 10786) reaching number eight on the Country charts in 1950. It became one of his signature songs.

Other versions

Leon McAuliffe had two Top 40 hits with "Faded Love", both reaching number 22 (Cimarron 4057, 1962, and MGM 14249, 1971). The former was an instrumental version, and the latter rendition was a collaboration with Tompall & the Glaser Brothers. Also in 1962, it was a modest hit for Jackie DeShannon, reaching number 97 on the Billboard Hot 100.

The song had greater success when Patsy Cline covered it in 1963. Her version became a hit, reaching number seven on the U.S. Country charts and number 96 on the Billboard Hot 100. Due to the airplane crash that ended Cline's life, her version was never released on a studio album. Instead, it was belatedly released on Patsy Cline's Greatest Hits, a compilation album in 1967. Cline's version was originally intended to be the title cut for a planned album, and was made at what turned out to be the last recording session before her death.

A recording made by Ray Price and Willie Nelson was the biggest hit version from a chart standpoint. Their duet version — which featured Crystal Gayle singing harmony on the chorus — reached number three on the Billboard Hot Country Singles chart in October 1980. The song, which came out at a time when Nelson was country music's biggest superstar, gave Price his first top 10 hit in more than five years and biggest hit in seven years.

References

Bibliography
McWhorter, Frankie. Cowboy Fiddler in Bob Wills' Band. University of North Texas Press, 1997. 
Whitburn, Joel. The Billboard Book of Top 40 Country Hits. Billboard Books, 2006. 

1950 songs
1950 singles
Bob Wills songs
1963 singles
1980 singles
Patsy Cline songs
Elvis Presley songs
Leon McAuliffe songs
Willie Nelson songs
Ray Price (musician) songs
Tompall & the Glaser Brothers songs
Dottie West songs
Western swing songs
Jackie DeShannon songs
Songs written by Bob Wills
Symbols of Oklahoma